Caplan is a municipality in the Gaspésie–Îles-de-la-Madeleine region of the province of Quebec in Canada.

There are various explanations as to the origin of the name Caplan, including: a corruption of capelin or Cape Land; from the surname of a certain John Kaplan, an Indian who long camped at this location; or from the Mi'kmaq word gaplanjetig (meaning "capelin").

The place was incorporated in 1875 as the Parish Municipality of Saint-Charles-de-Caplan. In 1964, it changed its status and was renamed to Municipality of Caplan.

Demographics

Population

Language

Climate

See also
 List of municipalities in Quebec

References

Incorporated places in Gaspésie–Îles-de-la-Madeleine
Municipalities in Quebec